Devon Cuthbert Thomas (born 12 November 1989) is a West Indian cricketer from Antigua.

Career

Domestic 
He was the leading run-scorer for the Leeward Islands in the 2018–19 Regional Super50 tournament, with 238 runs in eight matches. He was then the 2nd highest run-scorer for the team in the 2018-19 Regional Four Day Competition, and 4th highest scorer in the competition as a whole. In 2016, he was drafted by St Kitts and Nevis Patriots and since then, he has been playing for them in the Caribbean Premier League.

In October 2019, he was named as the captain of the Leeward Islands for the 2019–20 Regional Super50 tournament. He was signed by Kandy Warriors for the 2021 Lanka Premier League. He was drafted by Pune Devils for the 2021 T10 League.

International 
A right-hand batsman and wicket keeper, he played only one season for Leeward Islands before being given his One Day International debut on 28 July 2009 against Bangladesh while the first team were involved in a pay dispute with the West Indies Cricket Board. He batted in only one innings, scoring 29* from 32 balls, and took two wickets with his right-arm medium pace bowling.

Thomas is one of three wicket-keepers to have taken wickets in a One Day International. He achieved this feat bowling against Bangladesh cricket team in the 2nd ODI of the 3 match ODI series at Windsor Park (Dominica). He picked up the wickets of Mushfiqur Rahim and Mahmudullah, but could not prevent West Indies from losing the game.

In June 2022, he was named in the West Indies' Test squad for their series against Bangladesh.

References

External links
 
 

1989 births
Antigua and Barbuda cricketers
Leeward Islands cricketers
West Indies One Day International cricketers
West Indies Twenty20 International cricketers
Cricketers at the 2011 Cricket World Cup
Antigua Hawksbills cricketers
Living people
St Kitts and Nevis Patriots cricketers
Kandy Falcons cricketers
People from Saint Paul Parish, Antigua
Jamaica cricketers
Wicket-keepers